SVKM's NMIMS is a private deemed university located in Mumbai. The University also has campuses at Shirpur, Bangalore, Hyderabad, Indore and Navi Mumbai and two upcoming campuses in Dhule and Chandigarh. It has 17 constituent schools that offer both undergraduate and postgraduate courses in management, engineering, commerce, pharmacy, architecture, economics, mathematical sciences, hospitality, science, law, aviation, liberal arts, performing arts, architecture & design. It is accredited by NAAC with 3.59 CGPA and Grade A+. NMIMS was also awarded Category I University status
by MHRD.

History 
NMIMS was established in 1981, by Shri Vile Parle Kelavani Mandal with the help of a donation from Narsee Monjee Educational Trust, as a Management Institute affiliated to University of Mumbai. NMIMS began its journey by offering a Masters in Management Studies with an intake of only 40 students and 4 full time faculty.It became a deemed university established under Section 3 of the UGC Act, 1956 by notification of UGC in 2003.

Campuses 

SVKM's Narsee Monjee Institute of Management Studies has over the years grown and expand into a multi campus deemed university.

Mumbai

Started in 1981, the Mumbai campus is the oldest and currently has 17 schools & 9 centres of excellence.

The schools housed at Mumbai Campus include:
 School of Business Management, Mumbai  
 Centre of Excellence in Analytics & Data Science  
 Mukesh Patel School of Technology Management & Engineering
 Anil Surendra Modi School of Commerce
 Pravin Dalal School of Entrepreneurship and Family Business Management
 Kirit P. Mehta School of Law
 School of Mathematical Sciences
 Sarla Anil Modi School of Economics
 Shobhaben Pratapbhai Patel School of Pharmacy & Technology Management
 Sunandan Divatia School of Science
 School of Performing Arts
 School of Branding and Advertising
 Balwant Seth School of Architecture
 Jyoti Dalal School of Liberal Arts
 School of Design
 NMIMS Global Access School for Continuing Education (NGASCE)

Anil Surendra Modi School of Commerce

Anil Surendra Modi School of Commerce (ASMSOC), established in 2007, provides undergraduate and postgraduate courses in business administration, finance, as well as commerce. It was ranked as the best undergraduate B-School in India for its Bachelor of Business Administration (BBA) programme by India Today in 2018 and 2019. Admission to various courses is granted based on merit achieved in NPAT (Undergraduate) and NMAT (Postgraduate) entrance exams conducted by the university. The school was established in 2007 offering two courses BBA and B.Com. (Hons.) and shared its campus with MPSTME. In the year 2013, the school moved to its present campus which occupies the 7th & some parts of the 8th floor of Mithibai College. B.Sc Finance, a niche program focused on Investment Analysis, Portfolio Management and Corporate Finance was introduced in 2014. The school started offering masters programs in the year 2017 with its M.Sc. Finance program and the MMS program was introduced in 2018.

Amongst other programmes, it offers a Masters in Management Studies (Dual degree program for BBA students of NMIMS)

Shirpur
NMIMS' second campus at Shirpur, situated on the bank of Tapi river, was established in 2007. Department of Mechanical Engineering, MPSTME, Shirpur campus conducted international Conference with title ICEMEM 2019. The schools in Shirpur Campus include:
 Mukesh Patel School of Technology Management & Engineering
 School of Pharmacy & Technology Management
 Academy of Aviation

Bangalore
The Bengaluru campus was established in 2008. Bangalore campus of NMIMS is the youngest B-School to be accredited with AMBA. The schools in Bengaluru Campus include:
 School of Business Management (MBA)
 School of Economics
 School of Commerce
 School of Law
 School of Science

Navi Mumbai 
The Navi Mumbai campus was established in 2017. The schools in Navi Mumbai Campus include:
 School of Technology Management & Engineering
 School of Science
 School of Business Management
 School of Hotel Management
 School of Law
 School of Commerce

Hyderabad
The Hyderabad campus has a 90-acre fully residential campus in Jadcherla.

The schools in the campus are -

 School of Science 
 School of Commerce 
 School of Pharmacy and Technology Management  
 School of Technology Management and Engineering  
 School of Law

Indore
The campus in Indore was established in 2017 and is spread over an area of 25 acres. The schools include:

 School of Business Management
 School of Commerce
 School of Law
 School of Technology Management

Dhule(Upcoming)

 School of Commerce
 School of Law

Chandigarh (Upcoming)

 Schools to be announced

Rankings

NMIMS was ranked 55th among universities in India by the National Institutional Ranking Framework (NIRF) in 2021 and 94th overall. It also ranked 14 in the pharmacy ranking and 22 in the management ranking.

The School of Business Management was ranked fourth among private management schools in India by Outlook India in 2020.

Notable alumni 

 
 
John Abraham - Actor
Vikas Bahl - film director (Super 30)
 Avani Davda - MD, Nature's Basket
Dhvani Desai - animation filmmaker and poet
 Harish Iyer - LGBT activist
 Kiran Janjani - actor
 Aruna Jayanthi - CEO (Business Service), Capgemini
 Payal Shah Karwa - author
 Deena Mehta - MD and CEO, Asit C. Mehta Investment Interrmediates
 Nitin Rakesh - CEO and director, Mphasis
Sundar Raman - president, Reliance Sports
Shreya Shanker - model and runner up in Femina Miss India 2019
Shilpa Singh - model & runner-up in I AM She – Miss Universe India 2012

References

External links

SVKM’s NMIMS - School of Law

Business schools in Mumbai
Deemed universities in Maharashtra
Educational institutions established in 1981
1981 establishments in Maharashtra